is a Japanese voice actor from Aomori Prefecture. He currently works at Production Baobab.

Filmography

Television animation
 Inuyasha (2004) (Nezumi Zushi)
 Bleach (2009) (Tenken, Seizo Harugasaki)
 Super Dragon Ball Heroes (anime) (2020) (Dr.W)

Unknown date
 Detective Conan (Detective, Mamehara, referee, shop assistant, judge B, Detective Yamade, Nezumi's comrade)
 Chrono Crusade (Vido)
 Crayon Shin-chan (Gasoline stand employee)
 D.Gray-man (Charles)
 Digimon Adventure (Whamon)
 Digimon Adventure 02 (Ken's father)
 Digimon Data Squad (Jureimon)
 Digimon Tamers (Vikaralamon, Jijimon)
 Fairy Tail (Crux, Yajima, Olga Nanagia, Crawford Theme)
 Fresh Pretty Cure! (Tadashi Yamabuki)
 Kamikaze Kaito Jeanne (Detective Haruta)
 Kindaichi Case Files (Detective Shōno, student)
 Maho Girls PreCure! (Gustav)
 Mob Psycho 100 II (Prime Minister Hiroshi Yabe)
 Naruto Shippuden (Tenzen Daikoku, Kitsuchi, Jomae Village Leader)
 Nintama Rantarō (Snow ogre, others)
 One Piece (Gotti, Charlotte Oven)
 Otogi-Jūshi Akazukin (Juntarō Suzukaze)
 Phoenix (Soldier)
 Power Stone (Galuda)
 Samurai 7 (Gonzo)
 Scrapped Princess (Drake)
 Soul Eater (Sid Barrett)
 Superman: The Animated Series (Orion)
 Transformers: Cybertron (Megalo Convoy, Dino Snout, Road Storm)
 Transformers: Robots in Disguise (Terrashock)
 Toaru Majutsu no Index II (The Pope)
 Voltron Legendary Defender (Zarkon)

Theatrical animation
 Crayon Shin-chan: Honeymoon Hurricane ~The Lost Hiroshi~ (2019) (Hobakura)

Video games
 Crash Nitro Kart (2003, Japanese dub) (Tiny Tiger)
 Crash Tag Team Racing (2005, Japanese dub) (Crunch Bandicoot)
 League of Legends (2010) (Olaf)
 Ace Combat 7: Skies Unknown (2019) (Champ, Édouard Labarthe)
 The King of Fighters: All Star (2019) (Igniz)
 Guilty Gear -STRIVE- (2021) (Goldlewis Dickinson)
 Dragon Force (xxxx) (Gordack)
 God of War II (xxxx) (Typhon, Barbarian King)
 Sakura Wars V ~Saraba, Itoshiki Hito yo~ (xxxx) (Caluross)
 Tales of the Abyss (xxxx) (Tritheim)
 Tom Clancy's Rainbow Six: Vegas 2 (xxxx) (Domingo "Ding" Chavez)

Dubbing roles
 Dean Norris
 The One (Sgt. Siegel)
 Breaking Bad (Hank Schrader)
 Remember (John Kurlander)
 Secret in Their Eyes (Bumpy Willis)
 Death Wish (Detective Leonore Jackson)
 12 Rounds (George Aiken (Steve Harris))
 13 Hours: The Secret Soldiers of Benghazi (Dave Benton (David Denman))
 2 Fast 2 Furious (Enrique (Mo Gallini))
 Agora (Theon of Alexandria (Michael Lonsdale))
 Alita: Battle Angel (Grewishka (Jackie Earle Haley))
 Assassination Games (Polo Yakur (Ivan Kaye))
 Batman Begins (2007 NTV edition) (Joe Chill (Richard Brake))
 The Bay (Bill Bradwell (James Cosmo))
 Black Beauty (Terry (Hakeem Kae-Kazim))
 Blade Runner 2049 (Sapper Morton (Dave Bautista))
 Border (aka Desert Force) (Wing Commander Umar Shariff (Jackie Shroff))
 Chef (Carl Casper (Jon Favreau))
 Dark Kingdom: The Dragon King (Eyvind (Max von Sydow))
 Deadpool (Colossus)
 Debug (Iam (Jason Momoa))
 Dirty (Officer Salim Adel (Cuba Gooding Jr.))
 Doctor Sleep (Grandpa Flick (Carel Struycken))
 ER (Brandon Kirk)
 Escape Plan (Drake (Vinnie Jones))
 Fifty Shades of Grey (Jason Taylor (Max Martini))
 Fifty Shades Freed (Jason Taylor (Max Martini))
 Final Destination 2 (Detective Suby (Eric Keenleyside), Mr. Gibbons (Alf Humphreys))
 Fires (Doug (Sullivan Stapleton))
 Ford v Ferrari (Enzo Ferrari (Remo Girone))
 Game of Thrones (Benjen Stark (Joseph Mawle), Khal Drogo (Jason Momoa))
 The Godfather (2008 Blu-Ray edition) (Bruno Tattaglia (Tony Giorgio), Don Tommasino (Corrado Gaipa))
 Hart's War (Corporal Joe S. Cromin (Scott Michael Campbell))
 Hellboy (Ben Daimio (Daniel Dae Kim))
 I Am Legend (2010 TV Asahi edition) (The President of the United States (Pat Fraley))
 In the Light of the Moon (Ed Gein (Steve Railsback))
 Inception (Yusuf (Dileep Rao))
 The Invention of Lying (Jim the Bartender (Philip Seymour Hoffman))
 Kings of South Beach (Allie Boy (Steven Bauer))
 The Legend of the Condor Heroes (Jebe)
 The Libertine (Charles Sackville (Johnny Vegas))
 Mackenna's Gold (The Editor (Lee J. Cobb))
 Mission: Impossible 2 (2006 TV Asahi edition) (Doctor Nekhorvich (Rade Šerbedžija))
 Narc (Elvin Dowd)
 O Brother, Where Art Thou? (Junior)
 Paparazzi (Kevin Rosner (Kevin Gage))
 Piege (Murat (Laurent Lucas))
 Pixels (President Will Cooper (Kevin James))
 Quarantine (Danny Wilensky (Columbus Short))
 The Quiet Ones (Professor Joseph Coupland (Jared Harris))
 Repo Men (Jake Freivald (Forest Whitaker))
 Roboshark (Admiral Black)
 The Rookie (Wade Grey (Richard T. Jones))
 Saw 3D (Rogers (Laurence Anthony))
 Superbad (Officer Michaels (Seth Rogen))
 The Twilight Zone (Host (Forest Whitaker))
 Unthinkable (Charles Thomson (Stephen Root))
 Vantage Point (Howard Lewis (Forest Whitaker))
 Warrior (Father Jun (Perry Yung))
 Wind River (Ben Shoyo (Graham Greene))

References

External links
 Production Baobab Profile
 
 

1977 births
Living people
Japanese male video game actors
Japanese male voice actors
Male voice actors from Aomori Prefecture
20th-century Japanese male actors
21st-century Japanese male actors
Production Baobab voice actors